The Belfast and Northern Counties Railway (BNCR) Class B was a class of 4-4-0 two-cylinder compound steam locomotives that was introduced for passenger service in the north-east of Ireland during the late 1890s.

History 

The Belfast and Northern Counties Railway (BNCR) in the north-east of Ireland had standardised on locomotives with a 2-4-0 wheel arrangement for its principal passenger locomotives during the 1870s and construction continued through to the mid-1890s.  With increasing loads and heavier trains the limitations of that wheel arrangement became apparent and a new design was needed.  In 1897 the first purpose-built 4-4-0s, the Class B "Light Compounds", entered service.

Built by Beyer, Peacock and Company in Manchester, the Class B was turned out as a 4-4-0 version of the Class C 2-4-0 that had been introduced during 1890-95.  With the same type of boiler and identical cylinder sizes, it was no more powerful than the earlier design.

Two of the class, Nos.59 and 62 were "renewed" in 1924 as Class U1 4-4-0 locomotives although probably very little remained of the original engines except for their wheels and valve gear.

The other three members of the class received less radical rebuilding.  Nos.60 and 61 were firstly rebuilt as Class B1 compounds following which they underwent further alterations to become Class B3 4-4-0s in 1932.  No.24 was rebuilt as a simple to become the only member of Class B2 in 1925 and again to Class B3 in 1928.

Livery 

The BNCR painted the locomotives "invisible green" (a very dark bronze green that looked almost black) with vermilion, light blue and yellow lining.  The initials "BNCR" in block capitals were carried on the tender sides.

The livery remained the same under Midland Railway administration with the addition of the diamond-shaped Midland Railway crest to the cab sides and the initials "NCC" in gold block capitals on the tender sides.  Buffer beams were vermilion, and the smoke box was black.

References 
 
 
 

B
Steam locomotives of Northern Ireland
4-4-0 locomotives
Steam locomotives of Ireland
Beyer, Peacock locomotives
Railway locomotives introduced in 1897
Passenger locomotives
5 ft 3 in gauge locomotives
Scrapped locomotives